Madame Nguyễn may refer to:

Madame Thiệu Nguyễn, wife of Thiệu Nguyễn, former President of South Vietnam (1965–1975)
Madame Kỳ Nguyễn, wife of Kỳ Nguyễn, former Prime Minister of South Vietnam (1965–1967)
Định Nguyễn, former Vice President of Vietnam (1987–1992)
Bình Nguyễn (Vice President), former Vice President of Vietnam (1992–2002)